Sex reassignment may refer to:
 Sex reassignment, changing the sex assignment of an infant or child by parents and doctors, usually because of an intersex condition or trauma
 Sex reassignment, changing the sex characteristics of an older child or adult as part of a gender transition
 Sex reassignment therapy, any medical procedures regarding gender reassignment of both transgender and intersexual people
 Sex reassignment surgery, surgical procedures by which a person's physical appearance and function of their existing sexual characteristics are changed to that of another sex